Bayreuth 2 is the ninth studio album released by Joachim Witt in November 2000

Track listing 

 Bataillon d'Amour "Bataillon of Love" - 3:50 (Silly cover)
 Stay? - 4:41
 Der Sturm "The Storm" - 4:17
 In tiefer Nacht "In a deep Night" - 5:16
 Jetzt und ehedem "Now and Formerly" - 4:19
 Seenot "Distress" - 4:26
 Kyrie eleison! (Der Mönch) "Kyrie eleison! (The Monk) - 4:37
 Dann warst du da! "Then you were there!" - 4:19
 Hey - Hey (Was für ein Morgen!) "Hey - Hey (What a Morning!) - 4:14
 Die Flucht "The Escape" - 3:56
 Über den Ozean "Over the Ocean" - 4:36

2000 albums
Joachim Witt albums